This is a list of the people to manage Eintracht Frankfurt. Eintracht did not officially appoint a manager until 1919 when the late board member Albert Sohn coached the team. In 1921 the first full-time manager, Dori Kürschner, was appointed.

Paul Oßwald was in charge as manager in three stints, two before World War II and one after. Oßwald is also the longest serving manager in club history with 6 years in a single stint and accumulated 14 years overall.

Major national or and international trophy winning managers include Paul Oßwald (German championship in 1958–59), Elek Schwartz (Intertoto Cup in 1966–67), Dietrich Weise (DFB-Pokal in 1973–74 and 1974–75), Friedel Rausch (UEFA Cup in 1979–80), Lothar Buchmann (DFB-Pokal in 1980–81), Karl-Heinz Feldkamp (DFB-Pokal in 1987–88) and Niko Kovač (DFB-Pokal in 2017–18).

List

Managers

Managers
This list does not include caretaker managers or those who managed in a temporary capacity

Information correct as of 14 March 2023. Only competitive matches are counted

Caretaker managers

Notes

References

Sources

Managers
 
Eintracht Frankfurt